Fabrizio Convalle (born 11 April 1965 in Carrara) is an Italian former cyclist.

Major results
1989
3rd Overall Giro di Puglia
1990
1st Stage 5 Giro d'Italia

References

1965 births
Living people
Italian male cyclists
People from Carrara
Sportspeople from the Province of Massa-Carrara
Cyclists from Tuscany